The Napoleon Dynamite original soundtrack is the soundtrack to the 2004 comedy film, Napoleon Dynamite. It featured the original score, dialogue, and other artists' songs. It was released on October 5, 2004, by Lakeshore Records.

The original ending montage is not included in the soundtrack.  It is "Music for a Found Harmonium" by Patrick Street, which is in turn a cover of the original song by the Penguin Cafe Orchestra.

Track listing
"We're Going to Be Friends"-The White Stripes
 "What Ever I Feel Like"
 "I Want Candy" - Bow Wow Wow
 "Bus Rider" - John Swihart
 "Locker Room 1"
 "Every Moment (live)" - Rogue Wave
 "Pull in Town"
 "Nap Pulls Kip Return" - John Swihart
 "Nap Pulls Kip" - John Swihart
 "You Do Speak English?"
 "New Mate" - Figurine
 "Granny ATV" - John Swihart
 "Cagefighter"
 "A-Team Theme" - John Swihart
 "Here's Rico" - John Swihart
 "Summer's Cake" - John Swihart
 "Vote for Me"
 "Design" - Fiction Company
 "Locker Room 2"
 "Sometimes You Gotta Make It Alone" - Money Mark
 "Worst Video"
 "Thrifty" - John Swihart
 "Suit"
 "Suitwalk" - John Swihart
 "Talons"
 "Kip Waits" - John Swihart
 "Chapstick"
 "Solamente Una Vez" - Trío Los Panchos
 "Loch Ness"
 "Nap Store Video" - John Swihart
 "A Skit by Pedro"
 "Canned Heat" - Jamiroquai
 "D-Qwan Boogie" - John Swihart
 "Nap Dance Bedroom" - John Swihart
 "Whole Milk"
 "Only You" - Yaz
 "Nap Rico Van" - Joe
 "Nap Hangs Up the Phone" - Joe
 "Forever Young" - Alphaville
 "Time After Time" - Sparklemotion
 "Ninja Moves"
 "Alternate Ending Montage" - Joe
 "The Promise" - When in Rome

Other songs
These songs appeared in the movie, but are not included on the commercially released soundtrack.
 "We're Going to Be Friends" - The White Stripes
 "Larger Than Life" - Backstreet Boys
 "The Rose" - Darci Monet
 “Canned Heat (song)” - Jamiroquai
 "More Bounce to the Ounce" - Zapp and Roger
 "So Ruff, So Tuff" - Roger Troutman
 "Music for a Found Harmonium" by Simon Jeffes (covered by Patrick Street)*

References

External links
 Fox Searchlight: Napoleon Dynamite

2004 soundtrack albums
Napoleon Dynamite
Comedy film soundtracks